22nd Virginia may refer to the following American Civil War units:

 22nd Virginia Infantry Regiment
 22nd Virginia Infantry Battalion
 22nd Virginia Cavalry